Seán O'Casey Bridge is a pedestrian swingbridge spanning the River Liffey in Dublin, Ireland, joining City Quay in the Grand Canal Docks area to North Wall Quay and the IFSC.

Designed by architect Cyril O'Neill and O'Connor Sutton Cronin Consulting Engineers (for which they won an Institution of Structural Engineers Award for Pedestrian Bridges in 2006), the bridge was built in 2005 as part of a large-scale urban renewal scheme under the Dublin Docklands Development Authority to link the north and south quays and rejuvenate both. The swing bridge spans approximately 100 metres and has two balanced cantilever arms that swing open to permit boats to pass up river. Around 2010 the remote control that operates the swing bridge was misplaced, and the bridge was unable to be opened until the control system was reprogrammed in 2014.

The bridge was opened by Taoiseach Bertie Ahern in July 2005. It is named after the playwright and Irish Citizen Army member Seán O'Casey (1880–1964) who lived in the North Wall area of the city.

References

Bridges in Dublin (city)
Bridges completed in 2005
Pedestrian bridges in the Republic of Ireland
21st-century architecture in the Republic of Ireland